Calosoma rugulosum is a species of ground beetle in the subfamily of Carabinae. It was described by Stephan von Breuning in 1943.

References

rugulosum
Beetles described in 1943